Primorska Banka d.d. was a Croatian bank established on 25 September 2001 on the foundations of its predecessor, "Primorska štedionica" d.d. Rijeka. It began its work on World Savings Day, 31 October 1997.

Primorska banka d.d. Rijeka was a regional commercial bank that operated in the city of Rijeka and the Primorje-Gorski Kotar County, Istria County and Lika-Senj County. Most of the business was carried out with residents, artisans and corporate clients of the area.

As of 21 June 2018 the bank is in liquidation.

References

External links
Primorska Banka - Official website

Banks of Croatia
Banks established in 2001
Companies based in Rijeka
Croatian companies established in 2001